The United Nations member states are the  sovereign states that are members of the United Nations (UN) and have equal representation in the UN General Assembly. The UN is the world's largest intergovernmental organization.

The criteria for admission of new members to the UN are set out in Chapter II, Article 4 of the UN Charter:

 Membership in the United Nations is open to all peace-loving states which accept the obligations contained in the present Charter and, in the judgement of the Organization, are able and willing to carry out these obligations.
 The admission of any such state to membership in the United Nations will be effected by a decision of the General Assembly upon the recommendation of the Security Council.

A recommendation for admission from the Security Council requires affirmative votes from at least nine of the council's fifteen members, with none of the five permanent members using their veto power. The Security Council's recommendation must then be approved in the General Assembly by a two-thirds majority vote.

In principle, only sovereign states can become UN members, and currently, all UN members are sovereign states. Although five members were not sovereign when they joined the UN, they all subsequently became fully independent between 1946 and 1991. Because a state can only be admitted to membership in the UN by the approval of the Security Council and the General Assembly, a number of states that are considered sovereign according to the Montevideo Convention are not members of the UN. This is because the UN does not consider them to possess sovereignty, mainly due to the lack of international recognition or due to opposition from one of the permanent members.

In addition to the member states, the UN also invites non-member states to become observer states at the UN General Assembly, allowing them to participate and speak in General Assembly meetings, but not vote. Observers are generally intergovernmental organizations and international organizations and entities whose statehood or sovereignty is not precisely defined.

Original members

The UN officially came into existence on 24 October 1945, after ratification of the United Nations Charter by the five permanent members of the United Nations Security Council (the Republic of China, France, the Soviet Union, the United Kingdom, and the United States) and a majority of the other signatories. A total of 51 original members (or founding members) joined that year; 50 of them signed the Charter at the United Nations Conference on International Organization in San Francisco on 26 June 1945, while Poland, which was not represented at the conference, signed it on 15 October 1945.

The original members of the United Nations were: China (then the Republic of China), France (then the Provisional Government), Russia (then the Soviet Union), the United Kingdom, the United States (these first five forming the Security Council), Argentina, Australia, Belgium, Bolivia, Brazil (then the Vargas Era Brazil), Belarus (then the Byelorussian SSR), Canada, Chile (then the 1925–73 Presidential Republic), Colombia, Costa Rica, Cuba (then the 1902–59 Republic), Czechoslovakia (then the Third Republic), Denmark, the Dominican Republic, Ecuador, Egypt (then the Kingdom of Egypt), El Salvador, Ethiopia (then the Ethiopian Empire), Greece (then the Glücksburg Kingdom), Guatemala, Haiti (then the 1859–1957 Republic), Honduras, India, Iran (then the Pahlavi dynasty), Iraq (then the Kingdom of Iraq), Lebanon, Liberia, Luxembourg, Mexico, the Netherlands, New Zealand (then the Dominion of New Zealand), Nicaragua, Norway, Panama, Paraguay, Peru, the Philippines (then the Commonwealth), Poland (then the Provisional Government of National Unity), Saudi Arabia, South Africa (then the Union of South Africa), Syria (then the Mandatory Republic), Turkey, Ukraine (then the Ukrainian SSR), Uruguay, Venezuela and Yugoslavia (then the Democratic Federal Yugoslavia).

Among the original members, 49 are either still UN members or had their memberships in the UN continued by a successor state (see table below); for example, the membership of the Soviet Union was continued by the Russian Federation after its dissolution (see the section Former members: Union of Soviet Socialist Republics). The other two original members, Czechoslovakia and Yugoslavia (i.e., the Socialist Federal Republic of Yugoslavia), had been dissolved and their memberships in the UN not continued from 1992 by any one successor state (see the sections Former members: Czechoslovakia and Former members: Yugoslavia).

At the time of UN's founding, the seat of China in the UN was held by the Republic of China, but as a result of United Nations General Assembly Resolution 2758 in 1971, it is now held by the People's Republic of China (see the section Former members: Republic of China (Taiwan)).

A number of the original members were not sovereign when they joined the UN, and only gained full independence later:
 Belarus (then the Byelorussian Soviet Socialist Republic) and Ukraine (then the Ukrainian Soviet Socialist Republic) were both constituent republics of the Soviet Union, until gaining full independence in 1991.
 India (whose territory at that time, before the Partition of India, also included the present-day territories of Pakistan and Bangladesh) was under British colonial rule, until gaining full independence in 1947.
 The Philippines (then the Philippine Commonwealth) was a commonwealth with the United States, until gaining full independence in 1946.
 New Zealand, while de facto sovereign at that time, "only gained full capacity to enter into relations with other states in 1947 when it passed the Statute of Westminster Adoption Act. This occurred 16 years after the British Parliament passed the Statute of Westminster Act in 1931 that recognised New Zealand's autonomy. If judged by the Montevideo Convention criteria, New Zealand did not achieve full de jure statehood until 1947."

Current members

The current members and their dates of admission are listed below with their official designations used by the United Nations.

The alphabetical order by the member states' official designations is used to determine the seating arrangement of the General Assembly sessions, where a draw is held each year to select a member state as the starting point. Some member states use their full official names in their official designations and thus are sorted out of order from their common names: the Democratic People's Republic of Korea, the Democratic Republic of the Congo, the Republic of Korea, the Republic of Moldova, and the United Republic of Tanzania.

The member states can be sorted by their official designations and dates of admission by clicking on the buttons in the header of the columns. See related sections on former members by clicking on the links in the column "See also".

Former members

Republic of China (1945–1971)

The Republic of China (ROC) joined the UN as an original member on 24 October 1945, and as set out by the United Nations Charter, Chapter V, Article 23, became one of the five permanent members of the United Nations Security Council. In 1949, as a result of the Chinese Civil War, the Kuomintang-led ROC government lost effective control of mainland China and relocated to the island of Taiwan, and the Communist Party-led government of the People's Republic of China (PRC), declared on 1 October 1949, took control of mainland China. The UN was notified on 18 November 1949 of the formation of the Central People's Government of the People's Republic of China; however, the Government of the Republic of China continued to represent China at the UN, despite the small size of the ROC's jurisdiction of Taiwan and a number of smaller islands compared to the PRC's jurisdiction of mainland China. As both governments claimed to be the sole legitimate representative of China, proposals to effect a change in the representation of China in the UN were discussed but rejected for the next two decades, as the ROC was still recognized as the sole legitimate representative of China by a majority of UN members. Both sides rejected compromise proposals to allow both states to participate in the UN, based on the One-China policy.

By the 1970s, a shift had occurred in international diplomatic circles and the PRC had gained the upper hand in international diplomatic relations and recognition count. On 25 October 1971, the 21st time the United Nations General Assembly debated on the PRC's admission into the UN, United Nations General Assembly Resolution 2758 was adopted, by which it recognized that "the representatives of the Government of the People's Republic of China are the only lawful representatives of China to the United Nations and that the People's Republic of China is one of the five permanent members of the Security Council," and decided "to restore all its rights to the People's Republic of China and to recognize the representatives of its Government as the only legitimate representatives of China to the United Nations, and to expel forthwith the representatives of Chiang Kai-shek from the place which they unlawfully occupy at the United Nations and in all the organizations related to it." This effectively transferred the seat of China in the UN, including its permanent seat on the Security Council, from the ROC to the PRC, and expelled the ROC from the UN.

In addition to losing its seat in the UN, the UN Secretary-General concluded from the resolution that the General Assembly considered Taiwan to be a province of "China", which refers to the Greater China region. Consequently, the Secretary-General decided that it was not permitted for the ROC to become a party to treaties deposited with it.

Bids for readmission as the representative of Taiwan

In 1993 the ROC began campaigning to rejoin the UN separately from the People's Republic of China. A number of options were considered, including seeking membership in the specialized agencies, applying for observer status, applying for full membership, or having resolution 2758 revoked to reclaim the seat of China in the UN.

Every year from 1993 to 2006, UN member states submitted a memorandum to the UN Secretary-General requesting that the UN General Assembly consider allowing the ROC to resume participating in the United Nations. This approach was chosen, rather than a formal application for membership, because it could be enacted by the General Assembly, while a membership application would need Security Council approval, where the PRC held a veto. Early proposals recommended admitting the ROC with parallel representation over China, along with the People's Republic of China, pending eventual reunification, citing examples of other divided countries which had become separate UN member states, such as East and West Germany and North and South Korea. Later proposals emphasized that the ROC was a separate state, over which the PRC had no effective sovereignty. These proposed resolutions referred to the ROC under a variety of names: "Republic of China in Taiwan" (1993–94), "Republic of China on Taiwan" (1995–97, 1999–2002), "Republic of China" (1998), "Republic of China (Taiwan)" (2003) and "Taiwan" (2004–06).

However, all fourteen attempts were unsuccessful as the General Assembly's General Committee declined to put the issue on the Assembly's agenda for debate, under strong opposition from the PRC.

While all these proposals were vague, requesting the ROC be allowed to participate in UN activities without specifying any legal mechanism, in 2007 the ROC submitted a formal application under the name "Taiwan" for full membership in the UN. However, the application was rejected by the United Nations Office of Legal Affairs citing General Assembly Resolution 2758, without being forwarded to the Security Council. Secretary-General of the United Nations Ban Ki-moon stated that:

Responding to the UN's rejection of its application, the ROC government has stated that Taiwan is not now nor has it ever been under the jurisdiction of the PRC, and that since General Assembly Resolution 2758 did not clarify the issue of Taiwan's representation in the UN, it does not prevent Taiwan's participation in the UN as an independent sovereign nation. The ROC government also criticized Ban for asserting that Taiwan is part of China and returning the application without passing it to the Security Council or the General Assembly, contrary to UN's standard procedure (Provisional Rules of Procedure of the Security Council, Chapter X, Rule 59). On the other hand, the PRC government, which has stated that Taiwan is part of China and firmly opposes the application of any Taiwan authorities to join the UN either as a member or an observer, praised that UN's decision "was made in accordance with the UN Charter and Resolution 2758 of the UN General Assembly, and showed the UN and its member states' universal adherence to the one-China principle". A group of UN member states put forward a draft resolution for that fall's UN General Assembly calling on the Security Council to consider the application.

The following year two referendums in Taiwan on the government's attempts to regain participation at the UN did not pass due to low turnout. That fall the ROC took a new approach, with its allies submitting a resolution requesting that the "Republic of China (Taiwan)" be allowed to have "meaningful participation" in the UN specialized agencies. Again the issue was not put on the Assembly's agenda. In 2009, the ROC chose not to bring the issue of its participation in the UN up for debate at the General Assembly for the first time since it began the campaign in 1993.

In May 2009, the Department of Health of the Republic of China was invited by the World Health Organization to attend the 62nd World Health Assembly as an observer under the name "Chinese Taipei". This was the ROC's first participation in an event organized by a UN-affiliated agency since 1971, as a result of the improved cross-strait relations since Ma Ying-jeou became the President of the Republic of China a year before.

The Republic of China is officially  and the Holy See. It maintains unofficial relations with around 100 nations, including the United States and Japan.

States that no longer exist

Czechoslovakia (1945–1992)
Czechoslovakia joined the UN as an original member on 24 October 1945. Upon the imminent dissolution of Czechoslovakia, in a letter dated 10 December 1992, its Permanent Representative informed the United Nations Secretary-General that the Czech and Slovak Federative Republic would cease to exist on 31 December 1992 and that the Czech Republic and Slovakia, as successor states, would apply for membership in the UN. Neither state sought sole successor state status. Both states were readmitted to the UN on 19 January 1993.

German Democratic Republic (1973–1990)
Both the Federal Republic of Germany (West Germany) and the German Democratic Republic (East Germany) were admitted to the UN on 18 September 1973. Through the accession of the East German federal states to the Federal Republic of Germany, effective from 3 October 1990, the territory of the German Democratic Republic became part of the Federal Republic of Germany. In a letter to the general secretary, German Foreign Minister notified UN about this unification and stated that the Federal Republic of Germany would subsequently assume its membership under the name Germany. Consequently, the Federal Republic of Germany continued being a member of the UN while the German Democratic Republic ceased to exist.

Federation of Malaya (1957–1963)
The Federation of Malaya joined the United Nations on 17 September 1957. On 16 September 1963, its name was changed to Malaysia, following the formation of Malaysia from Singapore, North Borneo (now Sabah), Sarawak and the existing states of the Federation of Malaya. Singapore became an independent State on 9 August 1965 and a Member of the United Nations on 21 September 1965.

Tanganyika (1961–1964) and Zanzibar (1964)
Tanganyika was admitted to the UN on 14 December 1961, and Zanzibar was admitted to the UN on 16 December 1963. Following the ratification on 26 April 1964 of the Articles of Union between Tanganyika and Zanzibar, the two states merged to form the single member "United Republic of Tanganyika and Zanzibar", with its name changed to the United Republic of Tanzania on 1 November 1964.

Soviet Union (1945–1991)

The Union of Soviet Socialist Republics (USSR) joined the UN as an original member on 24 October 1945, and as set out by the United Nations Charter, Chapter V, Article 23, became one of the five permanent members of the United Nations Security Council. Upon the imminent dissolution of the USSR, in a letter dated 24 December 1991, Boris Yeltsin, the President of the Russian Federation, informed the United Nations Secretary-General that the membership of the USSR in the Security Council and all other UN organs was being continued by the Russian Federation with the support of the 11 member states of the Commonwealth of Independent States.

The other fourteen independent states established from the former Soviet Republics were all admitted to the UN:
 The Byelorussian Soviet Socialist Republic and the Ukrainian Soviet Socialist Republic joined the UN on 24 October 1945 together with the USSR. After declaring independence, the Ukrainian Soviet Socialist Republic changed its name to Ukraine on 24 August 1991, and on 19 September 1991, the Byelorussian Soviet Socialist Republic informed the UN that it had changed its name to Belarus.
 Estonia, Latvia, and Lithuania were admitted to the UN on 17 September 1991, after regaining independence before the dissolution of the USSR. They do not consider themselves to have been legally represented by the Soviet Union during its occupation.
 Russia took over the Soviet Union's seat on 24 December 1991, after a letter by president Boris Yeltsin was received by the secretary-general Javier Pérez de Cuéllar. 
 Armenia, Azerbaijan, Kazakhstan, Kyrgyzstan, the Republic of Moldova, Tajikistan, Turkmenistan, and Uzbekistan were admitted to the UN on 2 March 1992.
 Georgia was admitted to the UN on 31 July 1992.

United Arab Republic (1958–1971)

Both Egypt and Syria joined the UN as original members on 24 October 1945. Following a plebiscite on 21 February 1958, the United Arab Republic was established by a union of Egypt and Syria and continued as a single member. On 13 October 1961, Syria, having resumed its status as an independent state, resumed its separate membership in the UN. Egypt continued as a UN member under the name of the United Arab Republic, until it reverted to its original name on 2 September 1971. Syria changed its name to the Syrian Arab Republic on 14 September 1971.

Yemen (1947–1990) and Democratic Yemen (1967–1990)
Yemen (i.e., North Yemen) was admitted to the UN on 30 September 1947; Southern Yemen (i.e., South Yemen) was admitted to the UN on 14 December 1967, with its name changed to the People's Democratic Republic of Yemen on 30 November 1970, and was later referred to as Democratic Yemen. On 22 May 1990, the two states merged to form the Republic of Yemen, which continued as a single member under the name Yemen.

Yugoslavia / Serbia and Montenegro (1945–2006)

The Socialist Federal Republic of Yugoslavia, referred to as Yugoslavia, joined the UN as an original member on 24 October 1945. By 1992, it had been effectively dissolved into five independent states, which were all subsequently admitted to the UN:
 Bosnia and Herzegovina, Croatia, and Slovenia were admitted to the UN on 22 May 1992.
 North Macedonia was admitted to the UN on 8 April 1993, provisionally referred to for all purposes within the UN as "The former Yugoslav Republic of Macedonia" pending settlement of the difference that had arisen over its name. On 13 February 2019, it notified the UN that it had officially changed its name, following a settlement with Greece, to the Republic of North Macedonia.
 The Federal Republic of Yugoslavia (name later changed to Serbia and Montenegro) was admitted to the UN on 1 November 2000.

Due to the dispute over its legal successor states, the member state "Yugoslavia", referring to the former Socialist Federal Republic of Yugoslavia, remained on the official roster of UN members for many years after its effective dissolution. Following the admission of all five states as new UN members, "Yugoslavia" was removed from the official roster of UN members.

The government of the Federal Republic of Yugoslavia, established on 28 April 1992 by the remaining Yugoslav republics of Montenegro and Serbia, claimed itself as the legal successor state of the former Socialist Federal Republic of Yugoslavia; however, on 30 May 1992, United Nations Security Council Resolution 757 was adopted, by which it imposed international sanctions on the Federal Republic of Yugoslavia due to its role in the Yugoslav Wars, and noted that "the claim by the Federal Republic of Yugoslavia (Serbia and Montenegro) to continue automatically the membership of the former Socialist Federal Republic of Yugoslavia in the United Nations has not been generally accepted," and on 22 September 1992, United Nations General Assembly Resolution A/RES/47/1 was adopted, by which it considered that "the Federal Republic of Yugoslavia (Serbia and Montenegro) cannot continue automatically the membership of the former Socialist Federal Republic of Yugoslavia in the United Nations," and therefore decided that "the Federal Republic of Yugoslavia (Serbia and Montenegro) should apply for membership in the United Nations and that it shall not participate in the work of the General Assembly". For many years the Federal Republic of Yugoslavia refused to comply with the resolution, arguing that it was the legitimate successor to the Socialist Federal Republic of Yugoslavia and that the resolution and the sanctions were illegal and counted as a de facto expulsion of Yugoslavia from the UN (though the UN itself declared that the resolution was legal and de jure not an expulsion of Yugoslavia since they were not the legal successors of the Socialist Federal Republic of Yugoslavia and so the Federal Republic of Yugoslavia was never a UN member). Following the ousting of President Slobodan Milošević from office, Yugoslavia applied for membership, and was admitted to the UN as Serbia and Montenegro on 1 November 2000. On 4 February 2003, the Federal Republic of Yugoslavia had its official name changed to Serbia and Montenegro, following the adoption and promulgation of the Constitutional Charter of Serbia and Montenegro by the Assembly of the Federal Republic of Yugoslavia.

On the basis of a referendum held on 21 May 2006, Montenegro declared independence from Serbia and Montenegro on 3 June 2006. In a letter dated on the same day, the President of Serbia informed the United Nations Secretary-General that the membership of Serbia and Montenegro in the UN was being continued by Serbia, following Montenegro's declaration of independence, in accordance with the Constitutional Charter of Serbia and Montenegro. Montenegro was admitted to the UN on 28 June 2006.

In the aftermath of the Kosovo War, the territory of Kosovo, then an autonomous province of the Federal Republic of Yugoslavia, was put under the interim administration of the United Nations Mission in Kosovo on 10 June 1999. On 17 February 2008 it declared independence, but this has not been recognised by Serbia. The Republic of Kosovo is not a member of the UN, but is a member of the International Monetary Fund and the World Bank Group, both specialized agencies in the United Nations System. The Republic of Kosovo has been , including three of the five permanent members of the United Nations Security Council (France, the United Kingdom, and the United States); several states have suspended or withdrawn their recognition of Kosovo's independence, bringing down the total to 98. On 22 July 2010, the International Court of Justice, the primary judicial organ of the UN, issued an advisory opinion, ruling that Kosovo's declaration of independence was not in violation of international law.

Suspension, expulsion and withdrawal of members

A member state may be suspended or expelled from the UN, according to the United Nations Charter. From Chapter II, Article 5:

From Article 6:

Since its inception, no member state has been suspended or expelled from the UN under Articles 5 or 6. However, in a few cases, states were suspended or expelled from participating in UN activities by means other than Articles 5 or 6:
 On 25 October 1971, United Nations General Assembly Resolution 2758 was adopted, which recognized the People's Republic of China instead of the Republic of China (since 1949 controlling only Taiwan) as the legitimate representative of China in the UN and effectively expelled the Republic of China from the UN in 1971 (see the section Former members: Republic of China). This act did not constitute as the expulsion of a member state under Article 6, as this would have required Security Council approval and been subjected to vetoes by its permanent members, which included the Republic of China itself and the United States, which at that time still recognized the Republic of China.
 In October 1974, the Security Council considered a draft resolution that would have recommended that the General Assembly immediately expel South Africa from the UN, in compliance with Article 6 of the United Nations Charter, due to its apartheid policies. However, the resolution was not adopted because of vetoes by three permanent members of the Security Council: France, the United Kingdom, and the United States. In response, the General Assembly decided to suspend South Africa from participation in the work of the Assembly's 29th session on 12 November 1974; however, South Africa was not formally suspended under Article 5. The suspension lasted until the General Assembly welcomed South Africa back to full participation in the UN on 23 June 1994, following its successful democratic elections earlier that year.
 On 28 April 1992, the new Federal Republic of Yugoslavia was established, by the remaining republics of Serbia and Montenegro of the former Socialist Federal Republic of Yugoslavia. On 22 September 1992, United Nations General Assembly Resolution A/RES/47/1 was adopted, by which it considered that "the Federal Republic of Yugoslavia (Serbia and Montenegro) cannot continue automatically the membership of the former Socialist Federal Republic of Yugoslavia in the United Nations," and therefore decided that "the Federal Republic of Yugoslavia (Serbia and Montenegro) should apply for membership in the United Nations and that it shall not participate in the work of the General Assembly". It did not apply for membership until Slobodan Milošević was ousted from the presidency and was admitted on 1 November 2000 (see the section Former members: Yugoslavia).

Withdrawal of Indonesia (1965–1966)

Since the inception of the UN, only one member state (excluding those that dissolved or merged with other member states) has unilaterally withdrawn from the UN. During the Indonesia–Malaysia confrontation, and in response to the election of Malaysia as a non-permanent member of the United Nations Security Council, in a letter dated 20 January 1965, Indonesia informed the United Nations Secretary-General that it had decided "at this stage and under the present circumstances" to withdraw from the UN. However, following the overthrow of President Sukarno, in a telegram dated 19 September 1966, Indonesia notified the Secretary-General of its decision "to resume full cooperation with the United Nations and to resume participation in its activities starting with the twenty-first session of the General Assembly". On 28 September 1966, the United Nations General Assembly took note of the decision of the Government of Indonesia and its President invited the representatives of that country to take their seats in the Assembly.

Unlike suspension and expulsion, no express provision is made in the United Nations Charter of whether or how a member can legally withdraw from the UN (largely to prevent the threat of withdrawal from being used as a form of political blackmail, or to evade obligations under the Charter, similar to withdrawals that weakened the UN's predecessor, the League of Nations), or on whether a request for readmission by a withdrawn member should be treated the same as an application for membership, i.e., requiring Security Council as well as General Assembly approval. Indonesia's return to the UN would suggest that this is not required; however, scholars have argued that the course of action taken by the General Assembly was not in accordance with the Charter from a legal point of view.

Observers and non-members

Observers
In addition to the member states, there are two United Nations General Assembly non-member observer states: the Holy See and the State of Palestine.
 The Holy See holds sovereignty over the state of Vatican City and maintains diplomatic relations with 180 other states. It has been a United Nations General Assembly (UNGA) non-member observer state since 6 April 1964, and gained all the rights of full membership except voting on 1 July 2004.
 The Palestine Liberation Organization was granted observer status as a "non-member entity" on 22 November 1974. Acknowledging the proclamation of the State of Palestine by the Palestine National Council on 15 November 1988, the United Nations General Assembly decided that, effective as of 15 December 1988, the designation "Palestine" should be used in place of the designation "Palestine Liberation Organization" in the United Nations System. On 23 September 2011, Palestinian National Authority President Mahmoud Abbas submitted the application for UN membership for the State of Palestine to United Nations Secretary-General Ban Ki-moon; the application has not been voted on by the UN Security Council. On 31 October 2011, the General Assembly of UNESCO voted to admit Palestine as a member, becoming the first UN agency to admit Palestine as a full member. The State of Palestine was recognized as a United Nations General Assembly non-member observer state on 29 November 2012, when the UN General Assembly passed United Nations General Assembly resolution 67/19 by a vote of 138 to 9, with 41 abstentions. The change in status was described by The Independent as "de facto recognition of the sovereign state of Palestine". On 17 December 2012, UN Chief of Protocol Yeocheol Yoon decided that "the designation of 'State of Palestine' shall be used by the Secretariat in all official United Nations documents".

The Sovereign Military Order of Malta, which is not a sovereign state but an entity, has observer status at the UN and maintains diplomatic relations with 107 countries.

A number of states were also granted observer status before being admitted to the UN as full members. The most recent case of an observer state becoming a member state was Switzerland, which was admitted in 2002.

A European Union institution, the European Commission, was granted observer status at the UNGA through Resolution 3208 in 1974. The Treaty of Lisbon in 2009 resulted in the delegates being accredited directly to the EU. It was accorded full rights in the General Assembly, bar the right to vote and put forward candidates, via UNGA Resolution A/RES/65/276 on 10 May 2011. It is the only non-state party to over 50 multilateral conventions, and has participated in every way except for having a vote in a number of UN conferences.

Non-members
The Cook Islands and Niue, which are both associated states of New Zealand, are not members of the UN, but are members of specialized agencies of the UN such as WHO and UNESCO, and have had their "full treaty-making capacity" recognized by United Nations Secretariat in 1992 and 1994 respectively. They have since become parties to a number of international treaties which the UN Secretariat acts as a depositary for, such as the United Nations Framework Convention on Climate Change and the United Nations Convention on the Law of the Sea, and are treated as non-member states. Both the Cook Islands and Niue have expressed a desire to become a UN member state, but New Zealand has said that they would not support the application without a change in their constitutional relationship, in particular their right to New Zealand citizenship.

The sovereignty status of Western Sahara is in dispute between Morocco and the Polisario Front. Most of the territory is controlled by Morocco, the remainder (the Free Zone) by the Sahrawi Arab Democratic Republic, proclaimed by the Polisario Front. Western Sahara is listed by the UN as a "non-self-governing territory".

Sovereignty over Kosovo is disputed between the Republic of Kosovo and Serbia which considers it to be an autonomous province. As per United Nations Security Council Resolution 1244 and the ongoing dialogue on the political status of Kosovo, the Republic of Kosovo is not a member of the United Nations, despite having relations with half of member states. It is a member of two specialized agencies within the United Nations System: the International Monetary Fund and World Bank. It had applied for UNESCO membership but was unsuccessful in 2015.

Republic of China (Taiwan) is not a member of the UN, as People's Republic of China claims sovereignty over "Taiwan Province". See the discussion above in section Bids for readmission as the representative of Taiwan.

See also

 Enlargement of the United Nations
 List of current Permanent Representatives to the United Nations
 Member states of the League of Nations
 Palestine 194
 United Nations list of non-self-governing territories

Notes

References

External links

 
United Nations relations
History of the United Nations
United Nations
United Nations-related lists